The African Development Movement (MAD) was a political party in Gabon led by Pierre Claver Zeng Ebome.

History
The MAD contested the 2001 parliamentary elections, winning one of the 120 seats in the National Assembly, taken by Zeng Ebome. He retained the seat in the 2006 elections, in which the party was part of the bloc supporting the ruling Gabonese Democratic Party. 

The party held its Fourth Congress on 10 February 2008, reaffirming its participation in the Presidential Majority and re-electing Zeng Ebome as its President. It lost its seat in the 2011 elections.

In 2010 it was one of several parties that merged to form the National Union.

References

Defunct political parties in Gabon
Political parties disestablished in 2010
2010 disestablishments in Gabon